Mount Brazeau is a mountain in Alberta, Canada.

The mountain is located in the upper Coronet Creek Valley of Jasper National Park, and stands west of the Coronet Glacier and south of Maligne Lake. The mountain was named in 1902 by Arthur P. Coleman after Joseph Edward Brazeau, who had provided his translation skills to the Palliser expedition.

See also
Mountain peaks of Canada
List of mountain peaks of North America
List of mountain peaks of the Rocky Mountains
Rocky Mountains

References

Three-thousanders of Alberta
Mountains of Jasper National Park